The Treaty of Tuscaloosa was signed in October 1818, and ratified by congress in January 1819. endorsed by President James Monroe.  It was one of a series of treaties made between the Chickasaw Indians and the United States that year. The Treaty of Tuscaloosa was represented by Senator Andrew Jackson and ex-governor Isaac Shelby to the Chickasaw.  It resulted in the acquisition of the Jackson Purchase (which included extreme western Kentucky and most of the West Tennessee division).

Treaty
On October 19, 1818, state senator Jackson and former Kentucky governor Shelby, as plenipotentiaries for the state of Kentucky, completed negotiations with the Chickasaw on what was to become known as the Treaty of Tuscaloosa, one of several treaties consummated in 1818 which resulted in the Jackson Purchase.  The treaty targeted land that had been recognized as Chickasaw territory by the 1786 Treaty of Hopewell; that is, the lands in Tennessee and Kentucky that were west of the Tennessee River, an uninhabited woodland area of about 10,700 square miles of territory that the tribe controlled.

Prior to the signing of the treaty, Levi Colbert (Itawamba Mingo), who along with his brother George (Tootesmastube), had inherited the leadership of the Chickasaw tribe, had agreed to this transfer of the tribe's hunting grounds.  This was purportedly due to the acceptance of a bribe by the Colberts.  The expanse of land between the Mississippi River and the western valley of the Tennessee River was traded for $300,000, to be paid in twenty annual installments.  Other Chickasaw leaders party to the treaties were Chinubby and Tishomingo.

Results
The Treaty of Tuscaloosa was ratified by the Congress and Senate of the United States, and confirmed by President James Monroe on January 7, 1819.  With the acquisition, the state of Kentucky gained about 2,000 square miles, and Tennessee was enlarged by about 6,000 square miles.

Aftermath
There was an immediate rush of settlement to the area.  Jackson, along with John Overton and James Winchester, founded Memphis soon after.  By 1824, there were sixteen counties established in the acquired region.

References

Further reading
 Treaty with the Chickasaw: 1818; "The Avalon Project – Documents in Law, History and Diplomacy"; Lillian Goldman Law Library project; Yale Law School; accessed November 2020.

Treaties of indigenous peoples of North America
1818 treaties
United States and Native American treaties
Native American history of Kentucky
Native American history of Tennessee